The 2015 season was the New Orleans Saints' 49th in the National Football League (NFL), their 40th playing home games at the Mercedes-Benz Superdome and their ninth under head coach Sean Payton. On November 16, 2015, the Saints hired Dennis Allen to replace fired defensive coordinator Rob Ryan. However, the Saints still missed the playoffs for the second consecutive season. The Saints set a new league record for the most passing touchdowns allowed with 45.

Draft

Notes
 The Saints acquired an additional first-round selection (No. 31 overall) and center Max Unger as part of a trade that sent their fourth-round selection (No. 109 overall) and tight end Jimmy Graham to the Seattle Seahawks.
 The Saints acquired an additional third-round selection (No. 78 overall) and linebacker Dannell Ellerbe as part of a trade that sent wide receiver Kenny Stills to the Miami Dolphins.
 The Saints acquired an additional fifth-round selection (No. 154 overall) as part of a trade that sent guard Ben Grubbs to the Kansas City Chiefs.
 The Saints acquired an additional fifth-round selection (No. 167 overall) as part of a trade that sent their sixth-round selection (No. 187 overall) and 2016 sixth-round selection to the Washington Redskins.

Staff

Final roster

Schedule

Preseason

Regular season

Game summaries

Week 1: at Arizona Cardinals
With the loss, the Saints began 0-1.

Week 2: vs. Tampa Bay Buccaneers

Hoping to avoid an 0-2 start the Saints met Tampa Bay, led by new quarterback Jameis Winston.

The defense struggled to stop Winston as his heroics stunned New Orleans' home crowd.

Drew Brees left the game with an injured shoulder. The Saints wound up losing the game, 26-19.

Week 3: at Carolina Panthers

This game marked the first game Drew Brees missed as a Saint due to injury. Luke McCown, playing in relief of Brees, played well, throwing for 310 yards, before trying to hit Brandin Cooks in the end zone with roughly a minute left in the game. Josh Norman made a diving interception to seal the Panthers win and the Saints 0-3 start.

Week 4: vs. Dallas Cowboys

In overtime, Drew Brees, who returned from an injured shoulder, nailed an 80-yard pass to C. J. Spiller for the game-winning touchdown. Brees now has 400 career touchdown passes. It was also the fastest regular season overtime in NFL history, with only 13 seconds being played before the touchdown.

This win would make the Lions the only winless team.

Week 5: at Philadelphia Eagles
The Saints returned to Philadelphia for their first meeting with the Eagles since their last second victory in the 2013 playoffs, but the Eagles would get their revenge in a blowout. With the loss, the Saints fell to 1-4. This also marked the Saints' first loss to the Eagles since the 2007 season.

Week 6: vs. Atlanta Falcons
The Saints would upset the undefeated Falcons on Thursday Night Football. With the win, the Saints improved to 2-4.

Week 7: at Indianapolis Colts
In a Super Bowl rematch between the teams, the Saints would lead 27-0 at one point. Indianapolis would make it 27-21, but New Orleans would hold on for the win. With the win, the Saints improved to 3-4.

Week 8: vs. New York Giants

In a battle of passing offenses, Drew Brees threw a career-high 7 touchdown passes. The game was tied 49-49  late in the fourth quarter and the Saints returned a punt for 50 yards, good for the game-winning field goal to seal the Saints 52-49 victory.

Week 9: vs. Tennessee Titans
New Orleans would lead 28-20 with 7 minutes left, but the Titans would go down the field to tie it at 28. The Titans would then win the game after Marcus Mariota won it with a touchdown to Anthony Fasano.

With the loss, the Saints fell to 4-5.

Week 10: at Washington Redskins

Traveling to Washington to take on the Redskins, Drew Brees and the Saints suffered a moment of embarrassment as they would go on to be blown out 47-14. Kirk Cousins threw a career-high four touchdowns in the blowout.

A day after, the Saints fired defensive coordinator Rob Ryan, replacing him with Dennis Allen, who would take over for Ryan for the remainder of the season.

Week 12: at Houston Texans

The Week 12 clash against the Houston Texans would be no better than how the previous game unfolded, with the Saints offense being held to only two field goals (failing to score a touchdown for the first time since Christmas Eve 2005) and Brees failing to throw a touchdown pass the entire game, snapping his 45 game streak of doing so.

With the loss, the Saints fell to 4-6.

Week 13: vs. Carolina Panthers

The Saints made history in this game, becoming the first team in NFL history to block an extra point and return it for two points under new NFL rules that took effect that season (prior to this season, NFL rules did not allow players to return a blocked extra point). Saints rookie Stephone Anthony was the one who returned it, with Kevin Williams blocking it.  The Saints, unfortunately, would eventually lose in a shootout and dropped their record to 4-8.

Week 14: at Tampa Bay Buccaneers

The highlight of the game was Drew Brees passing Dan Marino for 4th on the league's all-time passing touchdowns list.

Week 15: vs. Detroit Lions
With the loss, the Saints fell to 5-9.

Week 16: vs. Jacksonville Jaguars
With the win, the Saints improved to 6-9.

Week 17: at Atlanta Falcons
With the win, the Saints ended their season 7-9 for the second straight season. This also marked the first sweep against the Falcons since 2013.

Standings

Division

Conference

References

External links
 2015 New Orleans Saints at Pro-Football-Reference.com

New Orleans
New Orleans Saints seasons
New Orleans Saints